Vue or VUE may refer to:

Places
 Vue, Loire-Atlantique, a commune in France
 The Vue, a skyscraper in Charlotte, North Carolina

Arts, entertainment and media
 Vue (band), a rock and roll band from San Francisco, California
 Vue International, a cinema company in the United Kingdom
 Vue Weekly, an alternative newspaper in Edmonton, Canada
 PlayStation Vue, a former American streaming service from Sony

Television stations
 KVUE, the ABC TV affiliate for Austin, Texas, US
 WVUE (Wilmington, Delaware), a defunct TV station in Wilmington, Delaware, US
 WVUE-DT, the Fox TV affiliate for New Orleans, Louisiana, US

Brands and enterprises
 Pearson VUE, an electronic testing company
 Saturn Vue, a sport utility vehicle
 Vue International, a multinational cinema holding company based in the UK
 Vue Pack, single-serve coffee system by Keurig
Vue.ai, A Madstreetden brand based in the USA

Science and technology
 Villitis of unknown etiology, a placental injury

Software
 E-on Vue, 3D landscape generation software from e-on software
 Visual Understanding Environment, a concept mapping tool
 Visual User Environment, Hewlett-Packard's graphical interface for the X Window System
 Vue.js, open-source reactive web application framework

Other uses
 Vue, a clan name of the Hmong people related to the name Wu